Live Worship with Tommy Walker is the first album of Christian worship music by Tommy Walker. The Contemporary Christian album was recorded live at the Christian Assembly in Los Angeles, California, and was released in 1994 by Maranatha Music and Word. This album features saxophone player Justo Almario, drummer Bob Wilson, percussionist Alex Acuna, and bassist Jerry Watts.

Track listing
"Sweet Presence Of Jesus"
"Don't Forget His Benefits"
"From The Sunrise"
"Intro"
"Show Your Glory"
"It Will Be Worth It All"
"When We See Him"
"Holy"
"Intro"
"His Love Endures Forever"
"Sweet Presence Of Jesus (reprise)"

Credits
Producers:
 Tommy Walker
 Bob Wilson

Executive Producer:
 Tommy Coomes

Arrangers
 Tommy Coomes
 Bob Somma

Worship Leader:
 Tommy Walker - Worship leader

Musicians:
 Bob Wilson - Drums
 Justo Almario - Flute, Saxophone
 Rique Pantoja - Keyboards
 Alex Acuna - Percussion
 Bob Somma - Guitar
 Jerry Watts - Bass
 Tommy Walker – Guitar

Vocals:
 Linda McCrary
 John Barbour
 Anne Barbour
 Jimmy "Z" Zavala
 Victor Perez
 Kristina Hamilton
 Bill Batstone
 Alfie Silas

Choir
 Dick Martin
 Bob Ross
 Steven Springer
 Jimmy "Z" Zavala
 Deborah Brown
 Sara Evans
 Kurt Knudson
 Laura Wood
 Susan Bauer Lee
 Alicia Correa
 Cathy Green
 Annette Lopez
 Andrea Rhodes
 Melanie Harrison
 Robert Wong
 Kim Wood
 Chris Brantley
 Norma Abad
 Sarah Hart
 Renee Porter
 Mike Bagasao
 Don Andrues
 David Artuso
 Suzy Avila
 Joy Bagasao
 Diana Bear
 Kent Butler
 Benjamin Chang
 Stephanie Chin
 Susan Christopher
 Tracy Clave
 Terri Cole
 Heather Colon
 Jean Cosby
 Tess Cox
 Shannon Denny
 Rosanna Carla DiLoreto
 Natalie Dunbar
 Mindi Ferguson
 Hannah Ford
 Bernie Franklin
 Colleen Frawley
 Jennica Frickman
 Alyssa Gayle
 Patricia Geyling
 Paloma Gibson
 Christy Gonzalez Aden
 Gerry Gonzalez
 Brad Hamilton
 Michelle Harden
 April Brown
 Peter Day
 Andy Evans
 David Haynes

Engineers
 Bernie Grundman -  Digital Mastering
 Jim Scheffler - Engineer

1994 albums
Tommy Walker (worship leader) albums